USS Porter (Destroyer No. 59/DD-59) was a  built for the United States Navy prior to the American entry into World War I. The ship was the second U.S. Navy vessel named in honor of both David Porter and his son David Dixon Porter.

Porter was laid down by the William Cramp & Sons of Philadelphia, in August 1914 and launched in August of the following year. She was armed with four  guns and had eight 21 inch (533 mm) torpedo tubes.

After her April 1916 commissioning, Porter conducted her shakedown cruise in the Caribbean. After the United States entered World War I in April 1917, Porter was part of the first U.S. destroyer squadron sent overseas. Patrolling the Irish and Celtic Sea out of Queenstown, Ireland, Porter severely damaged the German submarine  in April 1918.
  
Upon returning to the United States after the war, Porter operated off the east coast until she was decommissioned in June 1922. In June 1924, Porter was transferred to the United States Coast Guard to help enforce Prohibition as a part of the "Rum Patrol". She operated under the name USCGC Porter (CG-7) until 1933, when she was returned to the Navy. Later that year, the ship was renamed DD-59 to free the name Porter for another destroyer. She was sold for scrap in August 1934.

Design and construction 
Construction of the vessel was awarded to William Cramp & Sons of Philadelphia, which laid down her keel on 24 August 1914. Twelve months later, on 26 August 1915, Porter was launched by sponsor Miss Georgiana Porter Cusachs, a descendant of the ship's namesakes, Commodore David Porter (1780–1843) and son Admiral David Dixon Porter (1813–1891), both notable U.S. Navy officers.

Porter had two Curtis steam turbines that drove her two screw propellers, and an additional steam turbine geared to one of the propeller shafts for cruising purposes.

Porter was also equipped with eight  torpedo tubes. The General Board of the United States Navy had called for two anti-aircraft guns for the Tucker-class ships, as well as provisions for laying up to 36 floating mines. From sources, it is unclear if these recommendations were followed for Porter or any of the other ships of the class.

United States Navy career 
USS Porter was commissioned into the United States Navy on 17 April 1916 under the command of Lieutenant Commander Ward K. Wortman. Following her commissioning, Porters shakedown was conducted in the Caribbean.

The sextet arrived at Queenstown, Ireland, on 4 May and began patrolling the southern approaches to the Irish Sea the next day. Based at Queenstown, Porter met and escorted convoys from the United States as they entered the war zone.

Cassins stern had nearly been blown off and her rudder was gone, leaving the ship unable to steer.

On 28 April 1918, Porter severely damaged  while that German submarine was steaming to intercept a convoy. The destroyer was transferred to Brest, France, on 14 June. She returned to the United States at the end of the war, and operated off the East Coast until she was decommissioned on 23 June 1922.

United States Coast Guard career 
On 17 January 1920, Prohibition was instituted by law in the United States. Soon, the smuggling of alcoholic beverages along the coastlines of the United States became widespread and blatant. The Treasury Department eventually determined that the United States Coast Guard simply did not have the ships to constitute a successful patrol. To cope with the problem, President Calvin Coolidge in 1924 authorized the transfer from the Navy to the Coast Guard of twenty old destroyers that were in reserve and out of commission. Porter was reactivated and transferred to the Treasury Department on 7 June 1924 for use by the Coast Guard.

Designated CG-7, Porter was commissioned on 20 February 1925, and was stationed in New York for duties on the "Rum Patrol" to aid in the attempt to enforce prohibition laws. During her Coast Guard service, Porter captured the rum-running vessel Conseulo II (the former Louise) off the coast of Long Island.

After the United States Congress proposed the Twenty-first Amendment to end prohibition in February 1933, plans were made for Porter to be returned to the Navy. On 27 May 1933, Porter arrived at the Philadelphia Navy Yard, and was decommissioned nine days later, on 5 June. Porter was transferred back to the Navy on 30 June. Later in 1933  the ship was renamed DD-59 in order to free the name Porter for a new destroyer of the same name. DD-59 remained in noncommissioned status until struck from the Naval Vessel Register on 5 July 1934. She was sold for scrap on 22 August in accordance with the London Naval Treaty.

Notes

References

Bibliography

External links 
 

 

Tucker-class destroyers
Ships built by William Cramp & Sons
1915 ships
World War I destroyers of the United States
Ships of the United States Coast Guard
Ships transferred from the United States Navy to the United States Coast Guard